The Tamír Triad is a fantasy trilogy by American writer Lynn Flewelling. It contains three novels, and has a sister series, The Nightrunner Series, which contains seven. The series contains mythopoeia. The resounding issue dealt with within the series is the on-and-off war between two fictional countries, Skala and Plenimar, and their citizens, with other countries and people often getting caught in the crossfire.

The series focuses on Queen Tamír II, known throughout her childhood as Prince Tobin, and how she goes from being a sad, haunted child to a Warrior Queen. Dark magic was used to disguise her in childhood from her uncle, who would have all the women in his line killed in case they tried to take his throne, but the Oracle predicts that Tamír will be Queen, and many people go to unbelievable lengths to make sure that it happens.

It has been translated into multiple languages and published in multiple countries, including Russia. Bantam Spectra is the publishing company of all three, as well as the sister series, The Nightrunner Series.

Synopsis
The story is set in the land of Skala - a world with knights, lords, ladies and wizards. Long ago, the Lightbearer pronounced a prophecy; so long as a daughter of the royal line defends and rules, Skala will never be subjugated. Under the reign of Warrior Queens, Skala was free of famine and disease. However, Skala is now ruled by King Erius - a usurper king who took the throne in the place of his younger sister. King Erius' rule brought famine, plague, and invasion - and his fear of a child with a stronger claim to the throne led him to order the deaths of all girls of the royal line, save his sister.

The story begins when a wizard and her apprentice learn of a child born of Ariani, the King's sister. This child is destined to overthrow her uncle and become Queen of Skala, but to do this she will need protection and guidance. And if King Erius learns of her birth, she will be killed immediately.
Quickly, the Wizards rush to find a way to disguise their future Queen. Ariani gives birth to twins - a boy and a girl. In order to save the girl, they kill the boy-child and use hill-witch magic to transform the girl's body into that of a boy. The wizards tell the king that the girl-child, and not the boy, died in childbirth.

Saved by this lie, the child (named Tobin) grows up knowing nothing of her true identity as a girl and a future Queen, nor of the murder that was committed to save her. Tobin (thinking herself a boy) has a lonely childhood, hidden away from Court and all other children in order to keep him from danger. He grows up with a mother driven mad from the grief of losing a child, and a father who is rarely home because of the war that plagues their country. Often his only companion is the angry and vengeful ghost of his dead brother, who haunts him constantly.

But things start to change when the wizards bring him a companion - Ki. And eventually Tobin must travel to Court and take his place among the Companions of Prince Korin.

Tobin must resist powerful magic, learn to survive at Court, and become a knight and blooded warrior. He struggles with the issue of his identity. And one day he must challenge his friend and cousin for the throne, and fulfill a powerful prophecy.

Characters
Tamír í Ariani Gherilain, also known as Queen Tamír II, and previously known as Prince Tobin, was introduced in the first book, The Bone Doll's Twin. She is the main character in every book of the trilogy.

The main character of the 'Tamír Triad', Queen Tamír II was introduced as Prince Tobin. She was disguised as a boy so as to easily hide from her uncle, who would have her killed as a threat to his place on the throne, which was rightfully her mother's. Eventually she must reveal herself as female, and fight her cousin in civil war, in order to take her place on the throne and repair the country her uncle had tarnished in his rejection of the Oracle's declaration that there must be a Queen of Skala. She is mentioned in the Nightrunner Series as one of the greatest Skalan Queens, being responsible for the Great Canal, the new capital of Rhiminee', and the Third Oreska.

Countries and cultures

One defining feature of Skala is that the throne is always held by a Queen, power traveling matrilineally. The queen takes an active role in the defense of Skala, riding out and taking part in battles, and holds the military title of "War Commander." She is also in charge of helping her people in times of peace, by acting as the judge for public disputes, as well as controlling taxes, food availability, plague and more. This is due to the prophecy made at the Afran Oracle in Skala, which states:

This prophecy was made during The Great War with Plenimar, and King Thelatimos instantly handed the crown to his daughter Gherilain, who quickly led the country to victory. Other than the Queen, there are many important roles within the Skalan government, such as Commanders, Generals, Secretaries, Treasurers, etc. Many nobles own their own land and armies, though swear fealty to the Queen and give her their forces in times of war.

Following Queen Gherilain the First, there have been many Queens, and occasionally Kings. Those known are Tamír, who was poisoned by her own brother, Pelis, who became King until plague struck him down and his niece, Agnalain, became Queen. Then Gherilain II; followed by Iaair, who was known to have fought a dragon; Klia, who killed a lion; Klie; Markira; Oslie, who had six fingers; and Marnil, who began the tradition of having more than one consort. Having a King is not completely ruled out, but it is still very much the exception - a Queen is considered the obviously preferable option (the opposite of how things were in historical feudal monarchies); having a King instead of a Queen involves the risk of pestilence, drought and/or foreign invasion - all attributed to the Illior's curse. In the generation preceding that of Tamír II, Queen Agnalain III was the first mad Queen and Erius, her son, became King because his sister was still just a child at the time of their mother's death - but Tamír II, his niece, became Queen instead of his son when he died.

Moral issues

At the center of the Tamír Triad is the moral issue of whether the end justifies the means. This is put starkly at the very beginning. In order to save the future of Skala, the True Queen, Tamír, must survive the murderous schemes of her usurper uncle and live to grow to maturity. But in order to provide the magical disguise which alone could preserve her life, the well-meaning protagonists must perpetrate a terrible act - to kill an innocent baby, the future Queen's twin brother, at the very moment of his drawing his first breath. Throughout the three volumes, all those involved in this act not only suffer pangs of conscience but are also quite literally haunted by the vengeful ghost of the murdered baby.

In later stages of the plot, there are further cases where it is considered that the end justifies the means, and that anyone discovering the secret must be killed though they are completely innocent. There is a clear difference between the wizard Arkoniel - who tends to be more compassionate - and his teacher and mentor Iya, who while a positive character is more ready to make ruthless decisions. Arkoniel's approach is vindicated when he refrains from killing Ki, Korin/Tamír's beloved friend, though Ki was on the point of discovering the secret. As later seen, the living Ki plays a major role in helping Tamír realize her destiny.

Transgender issues

Transgender issues have a central role in the Tamír Triad as they virtually never were in earlier generations of fantasy writing. To begin with, Prince Tobin is to all appearances male - both in his own perception and in that of others. Boys who swim naked with Tobin have no reason to doubt his male anatomy. Yet, due to the magical reasons which are an important part of the plot, in the underlying, essential identity Tobin had always been a disguised girl. In the cataclysmic scene of magical change this becomes an evident physical fact, and Prince Tobin becomes Queen Tamír, shedding the male body and gaining a fully functioning female one. Yet it takes Tamír considerable time and effort to come to terms with her female sexuality. She feels especially queasy at the prospect of eventually becoming pregnant - as she must, since producing an heir is an important part of a Queen's duty. There is also the problematic relationship with Ki, who had been the close boy companion of Prince Tobin and whose transformation into the Queen's lover or Consort is far from smooth or easy.

Further reading
The companion series The Nightrunner Series,  also written by Lynn Flewelling, deals with the ongoing war between Skala and Plenimar from the perspective of two young spies, nearly 600 years after Tamír becomes Queen.

In the "afterword" appearing at the conclusion of Shards of Time, eighth and last book of The Nightrunner Series, Flewelling notes that she "had not forgotten Tamír and Ki", and might write more books about them. In Chapter 14 of Luck in the Shadows, the character Sedrich tells of Tamír's life from the perspective of six hundred years after her time: "Skala's had good queens and bad, but old Tamír was one of the best. Even the balladeers can't improve much on the life she led." This is followed by a brief recapitulation of Tamír's life. After speaking of the events covered in the Tamír Triad, Sedrich goes on tell that "during her reign she beat back the Plenimarans, was lost at sea during a battle, then turned up a year later and took back the throne and ruled until she was an old woman". As of mid-2017, this later adventure was not written out in full.  

Fantasy books by series
Fictional queens